The 2016 Akron Zips football team represented the University of Akron in the 2016 NCAA Division I FBS football season. They were led by fifth-year head coach Terry Bowden and played their home games at InfoCision Stadium–Summa Field. They were members of the East Division of the Mid-American Conference. They finished the season 5–7, 3–5 in MAC play to finish in a tie for third place in the East Division.

Schedule

Game summaries

VMI

at Wisconsin

at Marshall

Appalachian State

at Kent State

Miami (OH)

Western Michigan

at Ball State

at Buffalo

Toledo

Bowling Green

at Ohio

Roster

References

Akron
Akron Zips football seasons
Akron Zips football